A list of books and essays about David Fincher:

Fincher